The Amirante Islands (Les Amirantes) are a group of coral islands and atolls that belong to the Outer Islands of the Seychelles.

They stretch about 155 km from the African Banks (African Islands) in the north to Desnœufs (Isle des Noeufs) in the south, all on the shallow Amirantes Bank (Amirantes Plateau, with depths of mostly 25 to 70 m), except the main island Île Desroches in the east, and submerged Lady Denison-Pender Shoal at the northern end. 90 km south of the Amirante Islands is Alphonse Group, the closest group of islands, which are sometimes considered part of the Amirantes.

History
The Amirantes were discovered by Vasco da Gama on his second voyage of exploration in 1503, and later named "Ilhas do Almirante" (Admiral Islands). Previous knowledge of the islands by Arab and Indian traders is possible. The islands were claimed by Sieur Michel Blin for France in 1802. By the Treaty of Paris (1814), the islands were passed officially to the British, as a part of Mauritius. In 1909, the Seychelles became a separate colony, thereby including the Amirantes. On 8 November 1965 the United Kingdom split Île Desroches from the Seychelles to become part of the newly created British Indian Ocean Territory. The purpose was to allow the construction of a military base for the mutual benefit of the United Kingdom and the United States. On 23 June 1976 Île Desroches was returned to the Seychelles as a result of it attaining independence.

The total land area is 11.5 km2. The total population is 300. 
The biggest concentrations are the Prison 2 km from Marie Louise village and the Collins group construction camp which is 2 km from the capital village of Desroches village (which had a population of 35 in the last census).

Islands
There are eight single islands (five low sand cays and three uplifted sand cays), plus three atolls with a total of 18 islets (St. Joseph Atoll with 14, Desroches with 1, Poivre Atoll with 3). In addition to these 11 units, the following table also has entries for a reef and a shoal without islets, for the sake of completeness. The five largest ones in area are inhabited. The different island types are marked by different background colours in the table.

Alphonse Group
90 km south of the Amirante Islands is Alphonse Group, the closest group of islands, which are sometimes considered part of the Amirantes chain because they are a southern continuation or extension of the Amirantes chain. Alphonse Group lies south of the Amirantes Bank, separated from it by deep water (generally 1000 to 2000 metres deep).

Image gallery

See also
Geography of Seychelles

References

External links
Amirante Islands on Birdlife International
African Banks (with information about South Island being eroded by 1976)
Boudeuse
D'Arros
Desnoeufs
Etoile
Marie Louise

Archipelagoes of Seychelles
Archipelagoes of the Indian Ocean
Outer Islands (Seychelles)